Erythema infectiosum, fifth disease, or slapped cheek syndrome is one of several possible manifestations of infection by parvovirus B19. Fifth disease typically presents as a rash and is more common in children. While parvovirus B19 can affect humans of all ages, only two out of ten individuals will present with physical symptoms.

The name "fifth disease" comes from its place on the standard list of rash-causing childhood diseases, which also includes measles (first), scarlet fever (second), rubella (third), Dukes' disease (fourth, but is no longer widely accepted as distinct from scarlet fever), and roseola (sixth). Treatment is mostly supportive.

Signs and symptoms
Fifth disease starts with a low-grade fever, headache, rash, and cold-like symptoms, such as a runny or stuffy nose.  These symptoms pass, then a few days later, the rash appears. The bright red rash most commonly appears in the face, particularly the cheeks. This is a defining symptom of the infection in children (hence the name "slapped cheek disease"). Occasionally, the rash will extend over the bridge of the nose or around the mouth. In addition to red cheeks, children often develop a red, lacy rash on the rest of the body, with the upper arms, torso, and legs being the most common locations. The rash typically lasts a few days and may itch; some cases have been known to last for several weeks. Patients are usually no longer infectious once the rash has appeared.

Teenagers and adults may present with a self-limited arthritis. It manifests in painful swelling of the joints that feels similar to arthritis. Older children and adults with fifth disease may have difficulty in walking and in bending joints such as wrists, knees, ankles, fingers, and shoulders.

The disease is usually mild, but in certain risk groups and rare circumstances, it can have serious consequences:
 In pregnant women, infection in the first trimester has been linked to hydrops fetalis, causing spontaneous miscarriage.
 In people with sickle-cell disease or other forms of chronic hemolytic anemia such as hereditary spherocytosis, infection can precipitate an aplastic crisis.
 Those who are immunocompromised (HIV/AIDS, chemotherapy) may be at risk for complications if exposed.
 In less than 5% of women with parvovirus B19 infection, a baby may develop severe anemia leading to miscarriage. This occurs most often during the first half of pregnancy.

Causes 
Fifth disease, also known as erythema infectiosum, is caused by parvovirus B19, which only infects humans. Infection by parvovirus B19 can lead to multiple clinical manifestations, but the most common is fifth disease.

Parvovirus B19 (B19V) is a small, single-stranded, non-enveloped DNA virus. Binding of B19V capsid to the cellular receptor globoside (Gb4Cer) results in a cascade of structural changes and subsequent signal transduction processes facilitating the entry of parvovirus B19 into the host cell. After gaining access to the host cell, B19V binds to glycosphingolipid globoside (blood group P antigen) targeting erythroid lineage in the bone marrow. Replication of viral genome and release of virus from infected cells lead to various complex effects on host's cellular environment such as induction of DNA damage, hijack of cell cycle and apoptosis (killing of infected cells).

B19V DNA has been found in a wide range of tissues in healthy and diseased individuals indicates the persistence of B19V infection. According to a clinical microbiology review published by Jianming Qiu "Persistence of viral DNA has been detected in up to 50% of biopsy specimens of the spleen, lymph nodes, tonsils, liver, heart, synovial tissues, skin, brain, and testes, for decades after infection."

Recovery from parvovirus B19 infection is achieved by production of IgM antibodies which are specific for virus and are generated 10–12 days after infection. After day 16, when signs of fifth disease (red rashes) and arthralgia (pain in joints) becomes apparent, specific anti B19 IgG is produced by immune cells. Production of serum anti B19 IgG keeps infection under control and facilitates the recovery of erythroid cell production in erythroid lineage cells that were targeted by parvovirus B19.

Diagnosis 
The "slapped cheek" appearance of the rash can be suggestive of fifth disease, however, the rash can be mistaken with other skin related disease or infections. Blood samples testing can be definitive in confirming diagnosis. Anti-parvovirus B19 IgM antibody serum assay is the preferred method to detect previous infection. An antibody assay uses antibodies designed to detect parvovirus antigen or protein in blood circulation. The assay can result positive one week after initial infection. Negative results may prompt retesting in the future to rule out early sampling of blood serum.  A positive result can also be indicative of an infection within the past two to six months. People acquire lifetime immunity if IgG antibodies are produced in response to parvovirus B19 exposure. Infection by parvovirus B19 can also be confirmed by isolation of viral DNA detected by PCR or direct hybridization. PCR Is considered significantly more sensitive to detecting viral antigen compared direct DNA hybridization. DNA hybridization assay can better detect variants of the parvovirus B19. There exists 3 biological similar genotypes of parvovirus B19, numbered one through three. The most common genotype circulating is genotype one. Laboratory tests can indicate complications of infection, including anemia, liver damage, and low platelet count.

Transmission 
Fifth disease is transmitted primarily by respiratory secretions (saliva, mucus, etc.), but can also be spread by contact with infected blood. The incubation period (the time between the initial infection and the onset of symptoms) is usually between 4 and 21 days. Individuals with fifth disease are most infectious before the onset of symptoms. Typically, school children, day-care workers, teachers, and parents are most likely to be exposed to the virus. When symptoms are evident, the risk of transmission is small; therefore, symptomatic individuals do not need to be isolated. Vertical transmission from maternal infection may also occur, which can lead to hydrops fetalis due to the infection's detrimental effects on red blood cell production.

Treatment 
Treatment is supportive, as the infection is frequently self-limiting. No specific therapy is recommended. Antipyretics are commonly used to reduce fevers. In cases of arthropathy, such as those with arthritis or arthralgia, non-steroidal anti-inflammatories (NSAIDs) or other ant-inflammatories can be used. The rash usually does not itch, but can be mildly painful. The rash itself is not considered contagious. The infection generally lasts about 5 to 10 days. Stress, hot temperatures, exercise, and exposure to sunlight can contribute to reoccurrence within months of the initial infection. Upon resolution, immunity is considered life-long. Populations at greater risk of complications (see below) may need referral to a specialist. Anemia is a more severe complication that could result from parvovirus B19 infection and requires a blood transfusion as part of therapy.

Epidemiology 
Fifth Disease is a viral illness caused by Parvovirus B19. The illness is very common and self-limiting. The modes of transmission include respiratory droplets, blood, or mother to fetus. Fifth Disease is most prevalent in children aged 5 to 15 years old. Fifth disease occurs at lower rates in adults. The virus spreads easily and once contracted, the body will begin developing lasting immunity to reinfection. The prevalence of antibodies is 50% in children and 70% to 85% in adults. The virus affects both men and women equally. During the spring and winter, epidemic outbreaks are most likely to occur. In the summer and fall, sporadic cases and outbreaks occur. The outbreaks most commonly occur in daycares and schools. The periodicity of the outbreak cycle is three-to-seven years. The risk of acquiring the viral illness increases when exposed to an infected person or contaminated blood. Individuals who have an occupation that requires close contact with infected people such as healthcare workers and teachers are at an increased risk of acquiring the viral illness. Another risk factor of fifth disease are immunocompromised individuals, those with anemia are at a higher risk of developing complications. Pregnant women are at risk for acquiring viral illness, especially during the first half of pregnancy. Though, complications are very rare and less than 5% of these cases will experience serious complications. The most common complication among pregnant women is anemia. In rare cases, severe anemia can occur, and a buildup of fluid can develop. A buildup of fluid can cause congestive heart failure or death. A blood infusion or induction may be necessary. No vaccine is available for human parvovirus B19, though attempts have been made to develop one.

History 

Parvovirus, the virus causing the fifth disease, was first discovered in 1975 by Yvonne Cossart. It,  or a disease presenting similarly, was first described by Robert Willan in his book called On Cutaneous Diseases in 1808 as "rubeola, sine catarrho". It was better defined by Anton Tschamer in 1889 as a rubella variant (Ortliche Rotheln) and described it as abortive rubella, identified as a distinct condition in 1896 by Theodor Escherich, and given the name "erythema infectiosum" in 1899. The term "Fifth disease" was coined in 1905 by the Russian-French physician Léon Cheinisse (1871-1924), who proposed a numbered classification of the six most common childhood exanthems. The virus was first described in 1957 at the University of Pennsylvania  by Werner, Brachman et al.

Vulnerable populations 
A 2019 systematic review examined the rates of parvovirus B19 infection among daycare workers. Since transmission typically occurs through respiratory secretions, it was thought that daycare workers would be at an increased risk of infection because young children can spread saliva through drool. The systematic review indicates that daycare workers are at an increased risk for infection. Another review also supports the finding that daycare workers have an increased risk of contracting parvovirus B19 infection. A 2019 meta-analysis examined rates of parvovirus B19 infection among those with Sickle Cell Disease (SCD) using IgG and IgM antibody detection. Pooled data from Africa, Asia, and the Americas revealed a 48.8% parvovirus B19 infection prevalence among persons with SCD. Prevalence of infection was also determined by geographic location, where areas with reduced access to adequate housing had higher prevalence (Africa was 55.5%). A 2020 literature review also supports the finding that persons with SCD, as well as those with the blood disorder beta thalassemia, are at a higher risk of parvovirus B19 infection.

Complications 
There are some known complications associated with Fifth Disease relating to pregnancy. While parvovirus B19 is typically transmitted via respiratory secretions or hand to mouth contact, it has also been known to be passed from pregnant mothers to fetuses. Roughly 50-75% of all pregnant women are immune to parvovirus B19 while the remainder of women are susceptible to mild illness. A majority of fetuses who do contract parvovirus B19 show either no significant symptoms or complete resolution of the virus. However, the following serious complications are rare but possible: miscarriage, stillbirth, fetal anemia, hepatic failure, and abnormal neurodevelopment outcome. In some cases, fetuses would develop hydrops fetalis due to congenital parvovirus B19. This condition was studied as a determinant of later fetal outcomes, such as miscarriage or perinatal death, in 2016 systematic review. The review showed that those born with parvovirus B19 that caused hydrops fetalis did have an association with higher mortality risk and higher risk of complications. While the potential consequences of erythema infectiosum can be quite serious in pregnancy, mothers can be tested for immunity via the presence of IgG and IgM antibodies.

In addition to fetuses, parvovirus B19 infection and its effects has been studied in adults as well. The virus has also been associated with the development of neurological complications, as identified in a systematic review in 2014. This analysis included a total of 89 studies covering complications in both the central and nervous system such as encephalitis, meningitis, and peripheral neuropathy. However, the specific pathophysiology of these complications has yet to be discovered but the review does encourage the use of antibody testing to determine a patient's risk. Infection of this virus is not limited to the nervous system. Parvovirus B19 has also been linked to cases of cardiac inflammation that can cause structural damage to the heart over time. If the damage progresses and is significant, cardiac cell death may occur.

Individuals that are living with HIV are also susceptible to complications if infected due to being immunocompromised. While relatively rare, those who live with both HIV and parvovirus B19 infection will be unable to fight off the B19 virus. This can result in substantial loss of red blood cells and cause anemia.

See also 
 List of cutaneous conditions
 Roseola
 Virals

References

External links 
 Parvovirus B19 at the Centers for Disease Control and Prevention

Virus-related cutaneous conditions
Pediatrics
Viral diseases